"Suge" (also known as "Suge (Yea Yea)") is the breakthrough hit by American rapper DaBaby, released as the lead single from his debut studio album Baby on Baby on April 23, 2019. It reached number seven on the US Billboard Hot 100. The song's title is a reference to former music executive Suge Knight. It was produced by JetsonMade and Pooh Beatz. The song was later nominated for Best Rap Performance and Best Rap Song at the 62nd Annual Grammy Awards. "Suge" was ranked as the 2nd best song of 2019 by Complex, and the 12th best by Billboard.

Composition and lyrics
"Suge" contains "throbbing production", a beat that sounds like "ticking drums and a croaking synth-bass". The chorus contains a "yeah, yeah" interjection, hence the subtitle of the song. The song's lyrics have been described as "brazenly confident", with DaBaby rapping about keeping $32,000 in one of his pockets (and a Glock in the other), paired with "powerful vocal delivery, clever bars, and an oversize personality".

Critical reception
The Washington Post said the song "showcases DaBaby's versatility" in sounding "suave" and then being able to "flip the switch". Noisey called the track "one of the album's best singles and a restless mess of lines", adding that DaBaby "free associates in a way that feels like Young Thug".

Commercial performance
"Suge" debuted on the US Billboard Hot 100 at number 87 during the week of April 13, 2019, becoming DaBaby's first Hot 100 entry. Suge continued to climb the Hot 100 over the next several weeks, and has since peaked at number seven on the chart and at number three on the Hot R&B/Hip-Hop Songs chart. On June 23, 2019, the single was certified platinum by the Recording Industry Association of America (RIAA) for sales of over a million digital copies in the United States.

Music video
The music video for "Suge" was released on March 4, 2019. It features DaBaby in a variety of roles, including a mailman, Suge Knight, and dancing in an office. The video also features an excerpt from the intro song to his previous album, "Taking It Out".

Remix
On August 8, American rapper Joyner Lucas and Canadian rapper Tory Lanez ended their feud that started in 2018 by releasing a remix of the song together.

Nicki Minaj also made a non-official remix of the song premiering on her show, Queen Radio and also a snippet of her verse in an Instagram page.

In popular culture 
In 2021, memes related to the song blew up on social media such as Twitter. They included surrealist descriptions/depictions of DaBaby as a convertible, inspired by his lyrics in the song, where he stated: "I will turn a nigga into a convertible; Push me a lil' nigga top back (Vroom)." DaBaby was then noted for his apparent resemblance to a convertible. The sound effects and producer tags used in the song, such as ‘No Cap’ and ‘Oh Lord, JetsonMade Another One’ also became very popular.

Charts

Weekly charts

Year-end charts

Certifications

References

2019 singles
2019 songs
DaBaby songs
Interscope Records singles
Songs written by DaBaby
Internet memes introduced in 2021
Trap music songs